Next Generation is a studio album by American jazz vibraphonist Gary Burton. The album was released on  via Concord Jazz label. It features Burton with a group of prodigies including guitarist Julian Lage, pianist Vadim Neselovskyi, bassist Luques Curtis and drummer James Williams.

Reception
John Fordham of The Guardian wrote "There's a strong Pat Metheny feel in plenty of places (pianist Vadim Neselovskyi is a particular devotee, to judge by the easy swing of his work here) and Gary Burton's openness to both classical music and jazz gets a shapely acknowledgement in Samuel Barber's Fuga. The crystal stream of Burton's vibes winds engagingly around the piano and guitar on the standard My Romance, but it's bassist Luques Curtis's vampy, elliptical blues Ques Sez that brings the nearest thing to a mischievous flush to the cheeks of this rather glossily formal music. Pianist Neselovskyi also sounds the most promising of the young improvisers on it. Classical listeners on the lookout for jazz that doesn't tingle the teeth may like this set very much, but for all the collective expertise, very few unexpected corners get turned."

Ken Dryden of Allmusic stated "This meeting of a jazz master and four prodigies is well worth acquiring."

Track listing

Personnel
Gary Burton – vibraphone
Vadim Neselovskyi – piano
Julian Lage – guitar
James Williams – drums
Luques Curtis – bass

References

External links

Gary Burton albums
2005 albums